Harrisimemna trisignata, or Harris's three spot, is a moth of the family Noctuidae. The species was first described by Francis Walker in 1856. It is found in North America from Ontario, Quebec, New Brunswick, Nova Scotia, Newfoundland and Labrador, Alberta and Saskatchewan, south to Arizona. In the United States it has been recorded in Maryland, Pennsylvania, Wisconsin, Georgia, Illinois, Indiana, Iowa, New York, Ohio, Oklahoma, Tennessee, Texas and Virginia.

The wingspan is 30–36 mm. Adults are on wing from May to August in Canada.

The larvae feed on various woody plants, including wild raisin, winterberry, bush honeysuckle, black willow, white ash and apple.

References

External links
"Harris' Three-spot Moth". NatureServe Explorer. 

Moths of Maryland.
Lynn Scott's Lepidoptera Index.

Acronictinae
Moths of North America